League of Dragons is the ninth and final novel in the Temeraire alternate history/fantasy series by American author Naomi Novik. It was released by Del Rey Books on June 14, 2016.

Plot
Napoleon’s invasion of Russia has been roundly thwarted. But even as Capt. William Laurence and the dragon Temeraire pursue the retreating enemy through an unforgiving winter, Napoleon is raising a new force, and he’ll soon have enough men and dragons to resume the offensive. While the emperor regroups, the allies have an opportunity to strike first and defeat him once and for all—if internal struggles and petty squabbles don’t tear them apart.
 
Aware of his weakened position, Napoleon has promised the dragons of every country—and the ferals, loyal only to themselves—vast new rights and powers if they fight under his banner. It is an offer eagerly embraced from Asia to Africa—and even by England, whose dragons have long rankled at their disrespectful treatment.
 
But Laurence and his faithful dragon soon discover that the wily Napoleon has one more gambit at the ready—one that that may win him the war, and the world.

Reception
Reviewing the novel for NPR, writer Jason Heller stated: "League of Dragons masterfully wraps up so many plot threads and loose ends that had built up throughout the previous eight books". Publishers Weekly agreed, describing League of Dragons as a novel "packed with action and excitement, drawing the series to a delightful and satisfying close ..." Kirkus Reviews was less enthusiastic in their review, stating: "Not the finest entry in the sequence, being slow to gather momentum and somewhat patchy, but overall a satisfying conclusion to a remarkable series."

References

2016 American novels
American alternate history novels
American fantasy novels
Del Rey books
Dragons in popular culture
Novels by Naomi Novik
Temeraire books
Voyager Books books